Hassi Berkane (Tarifit: Ḥasi Barkan, ⵃⴰⵙⵉ ⴱⴰⵔⴽⴰⵏ; Arabic:  حاسي بركان) is a commune in the Nador Province of the Oriental administrative region of Morocco. At the time of the 2004 census, the commune had a total population of 8113 people living in 1344 households.

References

Populated places in Nador Province
Rural communes of Oriental (Morocco)